Koolasuchus is an extinct genus of brachyopoid temnospondyl in the family Chigutisauridae. Fossils have been found from Victoria, Australia and date back 120 Ma to the Aptian stage of the Early Cretaceous. Koolasuchus is the youngest known temnospondyl. Koolasuchus is known from several fragments of the skull and other bones such as vertebrae, ribs, and pectoral elements. The type species Koolasuchus cleelandi was named in 1997. Koolasuchus cleelandi was adopted as the fossil emblem for the state of Victoria, Australia on 13 January 2022.

History
The first fossil of temnospondyls found in the Strzelecki Group was NMV-PI56988, the posterior fragment of a jaw, collected around 1980. The jaw fragment was first mentioned in a 1986 publication by Anne Warren and R. Jupp, who did not definitively identify it as that of a temnospondyl due to the Cretaceous age of the specimen, much younger than any other known temnospondyl specimen at the time. In 1991, additional remains were reported including NMV-PI86040, an intercentrum (part of the vertebra) and NMV-PI86101, an isolated skull roof bone, likely representing either a frontal, a supratemporal or a parietal. The intercentrum unquestionably confirmed that temnospondyls were present in the Strzelecki Group. The morphology of the skull roof bone lead to the authors suggesting that the temnospondyl was either a member of Plagiosauridae or Brachyopoidea.

Koolasuchus was named in 1997 from the Aptian aged Wonthaggi Formation of Strzelecki Group  in Victoria. It is known from four fragments of the lower jaw and several postcranial bones, including ribs, vertebrae, a fibula, and parts of the pectoral girdle. A jawbone was found in 1978 in a fossil site known as the Punch Bowl near the town of San Remo. Later specimens were found in 1989 on the nearby Rowell's Beach. A partial skull is also known but has not been fully prepared. Koolasuchus was named for the palaeontologist Lesley Kool. The name is also a pun on the word "cool" in reference to the cold climate of its environment. The type species K. cleelandi is named after geologist Mike Cleeland.

Description

Like other chigutisaurids, it had a wide, rounded head and tabular horns projecting from the backside of the skull.

Koolasuchus is distinguished from other temnospondyls aside from Siderops and Hadrokkosaurus  by having the ramus of the mandible "articular is excluded from the dorsal surface of the postglenoid area by a suture between the surangular and the prearticular", and is distinguished from those two taxa by a lack of coronoid teeth.

Paleobiology
 
Koolasuchus inhabited rift valleys in southern Australia during the Early Cretaceous. During this time the area was below the Antarctic Circle, and temperatures were relatively cool for the Mesozoic. Based on the coarse-grained rocks in which remains were found, Koolasuchus likely lived in fast-moving streams. As a large aquatic predator, it was similar in lifestyle to crocodilians. Although eusuchians and kin were common during the Early Cretaceous, they were absent from southern Australia 120 million years ago, possibly because of the cold climate. By 110 Mya, represented by rocks in the Dinosaur Cove fossil locality, temperatures had warmed and crocodilians had returned to the area. These crocodilians likely displaced Koolasuchus, leading to its disappearance in younger rocks.

References

Chigutisaurids
Prehistoric tetrapod genera
Prehistoric vertebrates of Oceania
Prehistoric amphibians of Australia
Cretaceous temnospondyls
Aptian life
Fossil taxa described in 1997